Murexia is a genus of mice-sized dasyure, in the marsupial order Dasyuromorphia. They are found in Papua, Indonesia and Papua New Guinea.

Species
The genus was previously considered a monotypic genus, but now multiple species are recognised. 

short-furred dasyure (Murexia longicaudata)
long-nosed dasyure (Murexia naso)
black-tailed dasyure (Murexia melanurus)
Habbema dasyure (Murexia habbema)
broad-striped dasyure (Murexia rothschildi)

References

External links
 

Dasyuromorphs
Mammals of Papua New Guinea
Mammals of Western New Guinea
Marsupials of New Guinea